The Yanghyun Prize is an annual award for artistic achievement. It was created in 2008 following the wishes of Sooho Cho who promoted various cultural activities with the ultimate goal of bringing Korean art to the world stage.

The Prize, awarded each year to an artist for his or her significant achievement, rewards a cash prize of KRW 100,000,000 (approximately $90,000) and a chance to showcase a full exhibition at one of the world's most renowned galleries or museums of the winner's choice within 3 years of receiving the prize.

Prize Winners 

The prize winners, known as laureates, were as follows:

2008: Cameron Jamie
2009: Isa Genzken
2010: Jewyo Rhii
2011: Akram Zaatari
2012: Abraham Cruzvillegas
2013: Rivane Neuenschwander
2014: Apichatpong Weerasethakul
2015: Otobong Nkanga
2016: Hito Steyerl

External links 

 

Contemporary art awards
International art awards